Dr. Kim Sunghoon is a South Korean biologist.

Education
1981   B.S. Seoul National University
1983   M.S. Korea Advanced Institute of Science and Technology
1991   Ph.D. Brown University, U.S.

Work

Dr. Sunghoon Kim has been studying novel functions of human aminoacyl-tRNA synthetases(ARSs) and searching for their pathophysiological connections to human diseases(PNAS 105:11043, 2008; Nat Rev Cancer 11:708, 2011). He has identified potent novel tumor suppressors such as AIMP2/p38(Nat Genet 34:330, 2003), AIMP3/p18(Cell, 120:209, 2005). Besides, he has also investigated novel extracellular activities of ARSs and associated factors such as lysyl-tRNA synthetase(KRS)(PNAS 102, 6356, 2005), tryptophanyl-tRNA synthetase(WRS)(Nat Struct Mol Biol 11:149, 2004)  and AIMP1/p43(PNAS 103:14913, 2006). He also discovered the oncogenic variant of AIMP2, designated AIMP2-DX2, as one of the critical factors that determines the survival of lung cancer patients(Plos Genet 7:e1001351, 2011). More recently, he found that leucyl-tRNA synthetase(LRS) serves as an amino acid sensor for mTOR signal pathway(Cell 149:410, 2012).

In summary, his research is unveiling novel regulatory network mediated by human aminoacyl-tRNA synthetases that have been regarded as housekeeping machinery for protein synthesis. The regulatory roles and implications of these proteins in human diseases have been largely overlooked for decades. His series of the discoveries on the new function, pathology and medicine of ARSs are rapidly opening a research area that throws new insights into the central dogma of life and human diseases.

1991 - 1994    Post-doc, MIT 
1994 - 2001    Associate Professor, Sung Kyun Kwan University
2001–Present  Professor, Seoul National University
1988 - 2007    Director, Center for ARS Network National Creative Research Initiatives 
2007 - 2010    Director, Center for Medicinal Protein Network and Systems Biology
2010–Present  Director, Medicinal Bioconvergence Research Center

Awards
2000 The Donghun award, The Korean Society of Biochemistry and Molecular Biology
2003 Korea Science Award, Ministry of Science and Technology
2003 The Scientist of the Month, Korea Science and Engineering Foundation(KOSEF)
2006 The Best Scientist of the Year, Ministry of Science and Technology
2012 The Award of Korean National Academy of Science
2015 Ho-am Prize in Medicine, Ho-Am Foundation

See also
AwardsAminoacyl tRNA synthetase
Leucyl-tRNA synthetase

References

External links
College of Pharmacy, Seoul National University
Medicinal Bioconvergence Research Center
Dept. of Molecular Medicine and Biopharmaceutical Sciences, Seoul National University

South Korean biologists
Seoul National University alumni
KAIST alumni
1958 births
Living people
Recipients of the Ho-Am Prize in Medicine